Bělušice is the name of several locations in the Czech Republic:

 Bělušice (Kolín District), a village in the Central Bohemian Region
 Bělušice (Most District), a village in the Ústí nad Labem Region